It's a Love Cult is the tenth full-length studio album by the Norwegian band Motorpsycho. The album was preceded by the EP release of "Serpentine", for which also a video was made.

The sleeve was designed by Kim Hiorthøy.

Track listing
Überwagner or a Billion Bubbles in My Mind  – 5:36
Circles  – 3:59
Neverland  – 4:01
This Otherness  – 6:30
Carousel  – 7:16
What if...  – 4:15
The Mirror and the Lie  – 6:43
Serpentine  – 5:15
Custer's Last Stand (One More Daemon)  – 4:06
Composite Head  – 2:25

 #1, #2, #4, #7, #9 by Sæther.
 #3, #5, #10 by Ryan/Sæther.
 #8 by Ryan.
 #6 by Gebhardt.
Orchestral arrangements on #5, #7 by B. Slagsvold.
Horn/reed arrangement on #6 by L. Horntveth, H. Gebhardt.

Personnel
Bent Sæther: bass guitar, vocals, guitars, piano, harmonium, mellotron, percussion, viscount organ
Hans Magnus Ryan: guitars, vocals, rhodes piano, ARP, sidstation, electric harmonium, viscount organ, percussion, lap-steel
Håkon Gebhardt: drums, vocals, banjo, percussion, zither, guitars, glockenspiel, lap-steel

with:

Helge Sten (Deathprod): Audio virus, echoplex, filters, theremin, percussion
Baard Slagsvold: Piano, vocals, mellotron, clavinette, hammond organ

and:

Strings played by: Øyvind Fossheim, Vegard Johnsen, André Orvik, Hans Morten Stensland, Jon W. Sønstebø & Anne Britt Søvig Årdal
Horns and reeds played by: Ketil Vestrum Einarsen, Lars Horntveth, Anne-Grethe Orvik, Øyvind Brække, Mathias Eick.

References

2002 albums
Motorpsycho albums